Frank H. Williams (1908 – unknown) was an English footballer who played as a wing-half. Born in Kearsley, Lancashire, he played for Stalybridge Celtic, Manchester United and Altrincham. He originally signed for Manchester United as an amateur towards the end of the 1926–27 season, but then returned to Stalybridge for the 1927–28 season, before joining United as a professional in May 1928. He was reinstated as an amateur in September 1929 and became a regular in the Manchester United reserve team. Standing in for Ray Bennion in the half-back line, Williams' professional debut came on 13 September 1930, in a 7–4 defeat at home to Newcastle United, and was followed by two consecutive 3–0 defeats to Huddersfield Town and Sheffield Wednesday. United finished the 42-game league season bottom of the table with just 22 points, their worst total since their first two seasons in the Football League, when only 30 matches were played. Williams later moved to Altrincham, where he was also manager shortly after the Second World War.

References
Bibliography

Citations

External links
Profile at MUFCInfo.com

1908 births
Year of death missing
English footballers
Manchester United F.C. players
Stalybridge Celtic F.C. players
Altrincham F.C. players
Altrincham F.C. managers
Association football defenders
English football managers